James Gay-Rees is a British film producer. He has been involved in the production of numerous films, including critically acclaimed documentaries Senna (2010) and Amy (2015), for which he won numerous awards and nominations.

Graduating from the University of Southampton, Gay-Rees started his film career working for Miramax in London. He subsequently moved to New York for a year and later started working as a head of development in Los Angeles-based Orbit Productions.
Gay-Rees eventually decided to pursue his career in documentary production; his first movie is Exit Through the Gift Shop (2010) which was nominated for the Academy Award for Best Documentary Feature. His second film, Senna (2010), also received critical acclaim, and won a BAFTA Award for Best Documentary. In 2015, he produced Amy, which was nominated for numerous awards, including BAFTA awards for Best Documentary and Outstanding British Film, as well as Academy Award for Best Documentary Feature at the 88th Academy Awards.

Filmography 
 Exit Through the Gift Shop (2010)
 Senna (2010)
 McCullin (2012)
 The Wedding Video (2012)
 The Quiet Ones (2014)
 All This Mayhem (2014)
 Palio (2015)
 Amy (2015)
 Ronaldo (2015)
 Oasis: Supersonic (2016)
 Maradona (2018)
 Make Us Dream (2018)
 Formula 1: Drive to Survive (2019)
 Break Point (2023)

Awards and nominations 

|-
! scope="row" rowspan="3"| 2012
| rowspan="2"| British Academy Film Awards
| Outstanding British Film
| rowspan="3"| Senna
| 
| rowspan="2"| 
|-
| Best Documentary
| 
|-
| Producers Guild of America Awards
| Outstanding Producer of Documentary Theatrical Motion Pictures
| 
| 
|-
! scope="row" rowspan="5"| 2016
| Academy Awards
| Best Documentary Feature Film
| rowspan="5"| Amy
| 
| 
|-
| rowspan="2"| British Academy Film Awards
| Outstanding British Film
| 
| rowspan="2"| 
|-
| Best Documentary
| 
|-
| Grammy Awards
| Best Music Film
| 
| 
|-
| Producers Guild of America Awards
| Outstanding Producer of Documentary Theatrical Motion Pictures
| 
| 
|-
! scope="row"| 2022
| Sports Emmy Awards
| Outstanding Documentary Series – Serialized
| Formula 1: Drive to Survive
| 
|

References

External links 
 

Living people
Alumni of the University of Southampton
BAFTA winners (people)
British film producers
Grammy Award winners
Producers of Best Documentary Feature Academy Award winners
Sports Emmy Award winners
Year of birth missing (living people)